Host nation Switzerland competed at the 2020 Winter Youth Olympics in Lausanne, Switzerland from 9 to 22 January 2020. In total athletes representing Switzerland won ten gold medals, six silver medals and eight bronze medals and the country finished in 2nd place in the medal table.

Medalists

Alpine skiing

Boys

Girls

Biathlon

Boys

Girls

Mixed

Bobsleigh

Cross-country skiing

Curling 

Mixed team

Mixed doubles

Figure skating

Freestyle skiing

Ice hockey

Nordic combined

Short track speed skating

Skeleton

Ski jumping

Ski mountaineering 

Boys

Girls

Snowboarding

Speed skating

See also 
 Switzerland at the 2020 Summer Olympics

References 

2020 in Swiss sport
Nations at the 2020 Winter Youth Olympics
Switzerland at the Youth Olympics